Tesreau is a surname. Notable people with the surname include:

 Elmer Tesreau (1905–1955), American college football player
 Jeff Tesreau (1888–1946), American baseball player
 Krista Tesreau (born 1964), American actress

See also
 Tesro Aayam, a literary movement in Nepal and India